Patrik Sylvegård (born July 10, 1966) is a former ice hockey player, currently working as the CEO for Malmö Redhawks of the SHL. During his career he represented three teams: Örebro IK, Malmö Redhawks and Limhamn Limeburners HC.
He has current record of most goals scored in Malmö Redhawks with 171 goals

Playing career
He is one of Malmö Redhawks most outstanding players of all time. He is known for his resolute, tough style of play.
He has won the Elitserien (SEL) two times in 1991-92 and 1993–94. He has also won the IIHF European Champions Cup once in 1993. Malmö Redhawks has retired his No. 18 jersey.

Career statistics

References

1966 births
Living people
Malmö Redhawks players
Swedish ice hockey right wingers
Sportspeople from Örebro